European Heritage Days (EHD) is a joint action of the Council of Europe and the European Commission involving all 50 signatory states of the European Cultural Convention under the motto, Europe: a common heritage. The annual programme offers opportunities to visit buildings, monuments and sites, many of which are not normally accessible to the public. It aims to widen access and foster care for architectural and environmental heritage. These events are also known as Doors Open Days and Open Doors Days in English-speaking countries.

The event began in France in 1984, with La Journée portes ouvertes dans les monuments historiques, sponsored by the Ministry of Culture. In 1985, in Granada, at the 2nd European Conference of Ministers responsible for Architectural Heritage, the French Minister of Culture proposed that the project be internationalised under the Council of Europe. The Netherlands held their first Open Monumentendag in 1987. Sweden and the Republic of Ireland joined in 1989, as well as Belgium and Scotland in 1990.

In 1991 these events were united as European Heritage Days at the initiative of the Council of Europe, supported by the EU. By 2010, 50 signatory states of the European Cultural Convention had joined the EHDs. The most recent European Heritage Days event was hosted by Armenia in September 2019.

The Directorate General IV – Education, Culture and Heritage, Youth and Sport of the Council of Europe, in close cooperation with the Directorate General for Education and Culture of the European Commission, ensures the general orientation, definition and execution of the tasks to be achieved within the framework of the EHD. The Secretariat of the EHD is carried out by the Directorate of Culture and Cultural and Natural Heritage, under the responsibility of the Council of Europe's Steering Committee for Cultural Heritage.

Member states
Participating member states of the European Heritage Days are:

Responsible institutions per European country 

 : "Jornades europees del patrimoni" by Patrimoni Cultural
 : Tag Des Denkmals by Bundesdenkmalamt
 : 
 : Journées du patrimoine à Bruxelles / Open Monumentendagen in Brussel
 : Open Monumentendag Vlaanderen
 : Journées du patrimoine en Wallonie
 : "Journées européennes du patrimoine"  under the auspices of the Ministry of Culture 
 : Tag des offenen Denkmals by the Deutsche Stiftung Denkmalschutz
 : Heritage Week by the Heritage Council
 : "Giornate Europee del Patrimonio" by Ministero per i Beni e le Attività Culturali
 : "Eiropas kultūras mantojuma dienas" by National Heritage Board of Latvia
 : "Open Monumentendag" by Stichting Open Monumentendag
 : "Europejskie Dni Dziedzictwa" ("European Heritage Days") by National Heritage Board of Poland
 : "Jornadas Europeias do Património" by Direção Geral do Património Cultural
 : "Европейские дни наследия" by Russian Scientific Research Institute for Natural and Cultural Heritage
 : "Las Jornadas Europeas de Patrimonio" by Instituto del Patrimonio Cultural de España (Ministry of Culture)
 : "Les Jornades Europees de Patrimoni" by Patrimoni Cultural
 :
: Heritage Open Days by the National Trust.  London has a separate event, Open House London.
 : Doors Open Days by Scottish Civic Trust
 : Open Doors Days (Welsh: Drysau Agored) by Civic Trust for Wales
 : European Heritage Open Days
 : "Europäischer Tag des Denkmals - Journées européennes du patrimoine - Giornate europee del patrimonio" by the Swiss Information Centre for Cultural Heritage Conservation

Similar concepts
This idea is popular outside Europe, too, with similar schemes in Canada since 1974 in Alberta, the United States, Australia, and other countries, at various times of year. In Argentina and Uruguay the corresponding Día del Patrimonio is held on the last weekend of September, while in Chile the same event is held on the last Sunday of May.

See also
Culture of Europe
European Integration
European Year of Cultural Heritage (2018)

References

External links 

 European Heritage Days — includes links to the national sites of all participants
 Home page

Recurring events established in 1984
Doors Open Days
European culture
Cultural heritage of Europe
 
Pan-Europeanism